Yannick Smith (born November 21, 1990 in Hillsborough Township, New Jersey) was an American soccer player, and is now a gym teacher at Montgomery High School in Skillman, New Jersey.

Career
Smith played soccer at Hillsborough High School.

Smith played four years of college soccer at Old Dominion University between 2009 and 2012. He also spent the 2011 season with USL Premier Development League club Virginia Beach Piranhas.

On January 22, 2013 Smith was selected 75th overall in the 2013 MLS Supplemental Draft by Houston Dynamo. However, he wasn't signed by the club.

Smith signed his first professional contract with Finnish Kakkonen club Närpes Kraft, before moving to USL Pro club Dayton Dutch Lions on March 9, 2014.

References

External links
 

1990 births
Living people
American soccer players
American expatriate soccer players
Old Dominion Monarchs men's soccer players
Virginia Beach Piranhas players
Dayton Dutch Lions players
Association football forwards
Soccer players from New Jersey
Hillsborough High School (New Jersey) alumni
Sportspeople from Hillsborough Township, New Jersey
Expatriate footballers in Finland
Houston Dynamo FC draft picks
USL League Two players
USL Championship players
Närpes Kraft Fotbollsförening players